Bryce Lindores (born 12 September 1986) is an Australian Paralympic tandem cyclist.

Personal
Lindores was born on the Gold Coast and attended Somerset College. He played rugby, tennis and touch football when he was young. He became blind six days before his eighteenth birthday due to an accident in which a towing rope snapped while he was towing a car with his ute. He lives in the Gold Coast suburb of Mermaid Beach in the subdivision of Nobby beach. In 2009, he climbed Mount Kilimanjaro, Africa's highest mountain.

Career

Lindores began cycling in 2006, two years after the accident that took his sight. Six months later, he won a bronze medal riding with pilot Steve Storer at the 2006 UCI Para-cycling Track World Championships in Aigle, Switzerland and was awarded the 2006 Queensland Tandem Cyclist of the Year. He won a bronze medal at the 2008 Beijing Games in the Men's Individual Pursuit B VI 1–3 event with his pilot Steven George; the pair took six seconds off their personal best. He won a road racing gold medal at the 2010 Road World Cup. In 2011, his pilot was Sean Finning; that year he won a bronze medal in the 4 km individual pursuit at the 2011 UCI Para-cycling Track World Championships and a gold and silver medal in road events at the national championships. In 2012 he won a gold medal at the UCI Para-cycling Track World Championships in the men's tandem 4 km pursuit with his pilot Scott McPhee in their first competition together; his usual pilot, former world champion Mark Jamieson, could not attend the competition. He competed with Sean Finning at the 2012 London Paralympics and they won the silver medal in the Men's individual pursuit B . Lindores was due to ride with Jamieson, but Jamieson was denied a visa to enter England due to a criminal record.

References

External links

Australian Paralympic Committee profile
Cycling Australia profile

Paralympic cyclists of Australia
Australian male cyclists
Paralympic medalists in cycling
Cyclists at the 2008 Summer Paralympics
Cyclists at the 2012 Summer Paralympics
Medalists at the 2008 Summer Paralympics
Medalists at the 2012 Summer Paralympics
Paralympic silver medalists for Australia
Paralympic bronze medalists for Australia
Paralympic cyclists with a vision impairment
UCI Para-cycling World Champions
Australian blind people
Sportspeople from the Gold Coast, Queensland
20th-century Australian people
21st-century Australian people
1986 births
Living people